"Hataraku Otoko" is a single by Japanese pop duo Puffy AmiYumi released on November 22, 2006. The title song is used as the theme to the anime series Hataraki Man.

The single's tracks are all Puffy cover songs originally from different bands. 'Hataraku Otoko' was a song by  Tamio Okuda's band Unicorn, 'Lucy in the Sky with Diamonds' was by The Beatles, that originally appeared on John Lennon's tribute album 'Happy Birthday, John' and 'Don't Bring Me Down' by Electric Light Orchestra.

The single's cover is also notable for being drawn by Moyoco Anno, the creator of Hataraki Man.

The Song was later included in 2007's album Hit&Fun

Track listing
 働く男 (Hataraku Otoko/Working Man)
 Lucy in the Sky with Diamonds
 Don't Bring Me Down

Chart performance
The single peaked at number 41 on the singles chart, selling 3.426 copies that week, and stayed on the chart for 3 weeks.

References

2006 singles
Puffy AmiYumi songs